You Zheng (born 2 December 1963) is a Chinese engineer who is an academician of the Chinese Academy of Engineering, a former vice president of Tsinghua University, and currently present of Huazhong University of Science and Technology.

Biography 
You was born in Yangzhou, Jiangsu, on 2 December 1963. He secondary studied at Yangzhou High School of Jiangsu Province. He earned a bachelor's degree in 1985, a master's degree in 1987, and a doctor's degree in 1990, all from Central China University of Science and Engineering (now Huazhong University of Science and Technology). After graduating in June 1990, You joined the Department of Mechanical Engineering faculty and soon carried out postdoctoral research at Tsinghua University in November of that same year. 

You taught at Tsinghua University since December 1992, what he was promoted to professor in 1994 and director of the Department of Precision Instrument in 2005. In 2007, he was appointed dean of the School of Mechanical Engineering. After this office was terminated in 2014, he was given an administrative position of vice president, serving until 2021. 

On 30 May 2021, he was proposed as vice president of China Association for Science and Technology. On 20 October 2021, he was promoted to president of Huazhong University of Science and Technology, a position at vice-ministerial level.

Honours and awards 
 2007 State Science and Technology Progress Award (Second Class)
 2011 State Technological Invention Award (Second Class)
 2012 State Technological Invention Award (Second Class)
 2013 Member of the Chinese Academy of Engineering (CAE)
 2019 State Technological Invention Award (Second Class)

References 

1963 births
Living people
People from Yangzhou
Engineers from Jiangsu
Huazhong University of Science and Technology alumni
Academic staff of Huazhong University of Science and Technology
Academic staff of Tsinghua University
Presidents of Huazhong University of Science and Technology
Members of the Chinese Academy of Engineering